The 2008–09 Notre Dame Fighting Irish men's ice hockey team represented the University of Notre Dame in the 2008–09 NCAA Division I men's ice hockey season. Their regular season began on October 11, 2008, against Denver and concluded on February 28, 2009, against Michigan State Spartans. Note Dame finished first in the Central Collegiate Hockey Association and advanced to the 2009 CCHA men's ice hockey tournament where they defeated Michigan 5–2 in the championship game. Notre Dame was given the top seed in Midwest Region and second seed overall for the 2009 NCAA Division I men's ice hockey tournament. In the opening game of the tournament, the Fighting Irish lost 5–1 to Bemidji State. They played their home games at the Edmund P. Joyce Center, and were coached by Jeff Jackson. Notre Dame's assistant coaches included Paul Pooley, Andy Slaggert, and Mike McNeill. Their athletic director was Jack Swarbrick. Games were broadcast over the radio on local ESPN Radio (AM1580), and were reported on by local newspaper the South Bend Tribune and Notre Dame's student newspaper The Observer.

Rankings

Standings

Schedule and results
 Green background indicates shootout/overtime win (conference only) or win (2 points).
 Red background indicates regulation loss (0 points).
 White background indicates overtime/shootout loss (conference only) or tie (1 point).

Player statistics

Skaters
Note: GP = Games played; G = Goals; A = Assists; Pts = Points; +/- = Plus/minus; PIM = Penalty minutes

Goaltenders
Note: GP = Games played; TOI = Time on ice; W = Wins; L = Losses; T = Ties; GA = Goals against; SO = Shutouts; SV% = Save percentage; GAA = Goals against average; G = Goals; A = Assists; PIM = Penalty minutes

References
General

Schedule and results:  
Player statistics: 

Specific

External links
Notre Dame Fighting Irish men's ice hockey

Notre Dame Fighting Irish men's ice hockey seasons
Notre Dame
N
Notre Dame Fighting Irish
Notre Dame Fighting Irish